Rondonanthus is a genus of plants in the Eriocaulaceae. It endemic to northern South America.

Rondonanthus acopanensis (Moldenke) Hensold & Giul. - Bolívar State of Venezuela
Rondonanthus capillaceus (Klotzsch ex Körn.) Hensold & Giul. - Bolívar and Amazonas States of Venezuela; Guyana, northern Brazil
Rondonanthus caulescens (Moldenke) Hensold & Giul. - Aprada-tepui of Venezuela
Rondonanthus duidae (Gleason) Hensold & Giul - Bolívar and Amazonas States of Venezuela; northern Brazil
Rondonanthus flabelliformis (Moldenke) Hensold & Giul. - Toronó-tepui of Venezuela
Rondonanthus roraimae (Oliv.) Herzog - Mount Roraima along Venezuela/Guyana border

References

Eriocaulaceae
Flora of South America
Flora of the Tepuis